Thank You, Madame (German title:Opernring) is a 1936 Austrian musical film directed by Carmine Gallone and starring Jan Kiepura, Friedl Czepa and Luli Deste. It is also known by the alternative title In the Sunshine (Im Sonnenschein). The film's sets were designed by Julius von Borsody.

Cast
 Jan Kiepura as Toni Kowalski 
 Friedl Czepa as Mizzi, flower girl  
 Luli Deste as Corinne Dalma 
 Theo Lingen as Der Diener  
 Fritz Imhoff as Heini Weidl  
 Anton Pointner as Frank Dalma  
 Anton Neugenbauer as Der Operndirektor  
 Robert Valberg as Lawyer
 Babette Devrient as Großmamma Sophie 
 Maria Mell as Großmamma Emma

References

Bibliography 
 Hake, Sabine. Popular Cinema of the Third Reich. University of Texas Press, 2001.

External links 
 

1936 films
Austrian musical films
1936 musical films
Films directed by Carmine Gallone
Austrian black-and-white films